mCube is a fabless semiconductor company founded in 2009 and headquartered in San Jose, California, and offices at multiple locations in Hsinchu, Taipei, Shanghai, and Shenzhen. mCube manufactures and provide the world’s smallest microelectromechanical systems (MEMS) motion sensors, The Key enablers for New Internet of Moving Things (IoMT). Virtually anything that moves can take advantage of a motion sensor and thus it creates a huge market opportunity for MEMS manufacturers. By 2025, analysts predict more than 150 billion devices will be connected to the Internet and a large percentage of those devices will be in motion.

History 
mCube was founded by Charles Yang and Kleiner Perkins Caufield & Byers in 2009. Led by Ben Lee, President and CEO, mCube is privately held and backed by venture and strategic partner investors including DAG Ventures, iD Ventures America, Keytone Ventures, Kleiner Perkins Caufield & Byers, Korea Investment Partners, MediaTek and SK Telecom (China) Ventures, receiving $37M in its latest, Series C round of funding.

Technology 
Yole Développement confirmed mCube's monolithic single-chip MEMS+ASIC product as the world's smallest accelerometer in March 2014.  With over 180 patents filed to date, mCube integrates a MEMS sensor with ASICs onto a single die using standard CMOS processes. This approach enables sensors to be easily manufactured and designed for a broad range of applications. Single-chip MEMS+ASIC devices are cost-effective, consume little power, and feature high performance. These advancements make it possible to place one or more motion sensors onto nearly any object or device. In some cases, these MEMS motions sensors can be embedded directly onto a device without requiring a package, which saves considerable cost and space. mCube motions sensors have been adopted in a range a smartphone and tablet reference designs and are featured on the approved vendor lists of leading chip-set partners.

Products 
mCube offers a broad portfolio of motion sensor hardware and software solutions including accelerometer, magnetometer and software-based gyroscope products that provide up to 9 degrees of freedom (DoF). mCube has shipped more than 500 million accelerometers world-wide into the smartphone and IoT markets to date. mCube’s monolithic MEMS accelerometers enjoy substantial size, cost, power and performance advantages over the multi-chip modules from competing MEMS sensor manufacturers. 

In November 2017, mCube completed the acquisition of the 3D motion tracking products and technology company Xsens from ON Semiconductor. The Xsens products include a suite of technologies for converting motion sensor measurements into application data, deploying unique expertise in sensor fusion and motion-tracking application development, and drawing on an array of patent-protected algorithms. Xsens motion capture solutions have been used to create CGI animations in Hollywood blockbuster movies, and by automotive manufacturers such as Daimler to enhance the ergonomic design of vehicles. Xsens products are also used in industrial applications for autonomous vehicles, professional drones, smart farming and robotics. Xsens has to retained its brand name and will continues to operate from its current base in Enschede, The Netherlands as a stand-alone business unit of mCube. mCube and Xsens are now jointly developing new system solutions aimed at existing and new customers in the consumer, industrial, medical, sports science, autonomous vehicle and entertainment industries.

Key people 
 Ben Lee, CEO
 Bernie Chong, Vice President of Finance and Administration
Boele de Bie, COO & General Manager, Xsens

Markets 
mCube primarily sells to original equipment manufacturers (OEMS) of electronic devices including: smartphones, tablets, wearable devices, hearing aids, health and fitness monitors, gaming consoles, smart clothes, smart watches, shipment tracking and remote controls.

References 

Technology companies established in 2009
Companies based in San Jose, California
Fabless semiconductor companies
Semiconductor companies of the United States